The President of the Los Angeles City Council is the presiding officer of the Los Angeles City Council. The president presides as chair over meetings of the council and assignments to City Council committees and handles parliamentary duties like ruling motions in or out of order. The president automatically becomes an acting mayor when the mayor is out of state. Since 2020, the president has been elected at the first scheduled council meeting in January of even-numbered years.

The current president is Democrat Paul Krekorian, who was elected on October 18, 2022.

History

Early history 
The office of the President was created with the introduction of the Los Angeles Common Council in 1850, with one of the members of the Council serving as the President. The first president of the Common Council was pioneer David W. Alexander, who was elected in 1850 before resigning a year later. In 1889, the Los Angeles City Council was created under the first city charter, though the office stayed relatively the same.

New city charter 
In 1965, the job of President Pro Tempore was created to preside during the absence of the President, with the first officer being councilman Thomas D. Shepard. Shepard presided when L. E. Timberlake became acting mayor due to mayor Sam Yorty traveling outside the country. The assistant pro tempore was created in 1977 with councilman Ernani Bernardi as the officer, who presided over meeting if both the President and the President Pro Tempore are out.

Councilman John Ferraro is the longest serving president, serving for 20 years in two terms. The first woman to be elected as the City Council president was Pat Russell, who held the title until 1987 when she was defeated in the City Council elections. The first Latino elected was Alex Padilla in 2001 after defeating incumbent Ruth Galanter; he served as acting mayor days after the 9/11 attacks as mayor James Hahn traveled out of the city. The first African-American president was Herb Wesson, who was elected in 2012 and served until 2020. The first Latina president was Nury Martinez, who was elected in 2020 and served until 2022.

Responsibilities 

presiding over meetings of the council.
giving assignments to City Council committees.
handling parliamentary duties like ruling motions in or out of order.
serving as an acting mayor for the Mayor of Los Angeles if the office is vacant.

List of presidents (1919–present)

References 

 
Speakers of city councils